Aaron Smith may refer to:

Music
Aaron Smith (born 1985), real name of American rapper Shwayze
Aaron Smith (musician) (born 1950), American drummer and percussionist
Aaron Smith (DJ), American music producer
Aaron Smith, American guitarist for the band Brazil

Sports
Aaron Smith (American football) (born 1976), American football player
Aaron Smith (rugby league, born 1982), British rugby league player
Aaron Smith (rugby league, born 1996), British rugby league player
Aaron Smith (rugby union) (born 1988), New Zealand rugby union player

Other
Aaron Smith (author), author and freelance journalist
Aaron Smith (conspirator) (died 1701), English lawyer, involved in the Popish Plot and Rye House Plot
 Aaron Smith (filmmaker), co-creator of Australian TV series You Can't Ask That
Aaron Smith (magician) (born 1976), American magician and writer
Aaron Smith (neuropsychologist), president, International Neuropsychological Society
Aaron Smith (poet), American poet